Liu Baixin ; born 10 June 1935) is a Chinese physicist.

Upon graduating from Tsinghua University in 1961, Liu began teaching there. He was elected a fellow of the American Physical Society in 1998, "[f]or outstanding contributions to the understanding of amorphous alloy formation by ion beam mixing." In 2001, Liu was elected an academician of the Chinese Academy of Sciences.

References

1935 births
Living people
20th-century Chinese physicists
21st-century Chinese physicists
Tsinghua University alumni
Members of the Chinese Academy of Sciences
Academic staff of Tsinghua University
Fellows of the American Physical Society
Physicists from Shanghai